Lace is a 1928 Soviet silent film directed by Sergei Yutkevich and starring Nina Shaternikova, Konstantin Gradopolov and Boris Tenin. The film is based on the story "Wall-news" written by Mark Kolosov.

Plot
Komsomol members of a lace factory release their own wall newspaper. Senka the artist draws caricatures of local hooligans, the leader of whom is Petya Vesnukhin. Activist Marusja tries to get Petya out of bad company.

Cast
 Nina Shaternikova as Marusja  
 Konstantin Gradopolov as Petka  
 Boris Tenin as Club's director 
 Pyotr Savin as Boy  
 A. Shushkin as Senka  
 N. Mass as Ganya 
 D. Maloletnov 
 I. Kaznenkov as Blacksmith  
 Boris Poslavsky as The fellow with the guitar 
 Fyodor Brest as Boy 
 V. Bugayev as Boy  
 Espe I. as Watchwoman  
 Konstantin Nazarenko as Boy  
 Konstantin Rodendorf as Boy

References

Bibliography 
 Christie, Ian & Taylor, Richard. The Film Factory: Russian and Soviet Cinema in Documents 1896-1939. Routledge, 2012.

External links 
 

1928 films
Soviet silent feature films
1920s Russian-language films
Films directed by Sergei Yutkevich
Soviet black-and-white films